Valley Forge Casino Resort is a casino in Upper Merion Township, Montgomery County, Pennsylvania, just outside of Philadelphia. Located in the King of Prussia census-designated place (CDP), it was constructed on the existing site of the Valley Forge Convention Center and opened on March 31, 2012. It is owned and operated by Boyd Gaming.

History

Valley Forge Plaza
The casino complex originated as a mixed-use development called Valley Forge Plaza, constructed by developer J. Leon Altemose. The construction was highly controversial, because Altemose chose to use non-union workers. This led to protests by local union members, during one of which, on June 5, 1972, the construction site was firebombed. The first structures in the complex were the circular tower of the Sheraton-Valley Forge Hotel, an adjoining twin-screen cinema, and the connected curved executive office tower directly to the east, which opened in September 1973.

In 1985, Altemose constructed an enormous addition on the west side, which contained the Valley Forge Convention and Exhibition Center and a second hotel tower, which added 160 rooms to the Sheraton. In 1989, the newer western Sheraton hotel tower was converted to a separate hotel, the Radisson Hotel/Valley Forge. In 1992, the Radisson Hotel/Valley Forge was converted to a second Sheraton hotel within the complex, the Sheraton Plaza Hotel. In 1997, the Sheraton Plaza Hotel was merged back into the Sheraton Valley Forge Hotel. In September 1999, the Sheraton Valley Forge was converted to the Radisson Valley Forge Hotel. The western hotel tower was soon after converted to the Scanticon Valley Forge Hotel.

Casino conversion
In 2012, the complex was converted to the Valley Forge Casino Resort, and the Scanticon Valley Forge Hotel was converted to the Casino Tower wing of the resort, while the Radisson continued operating adjoining it. On March 31, 2012, Valley Forge Casino Resort became the 11th casino to operate in Pennsylvania. Back in 2009, rival casino Parx opposed the casino and challenged them in court, claiming that they did not meet the resort license requirements. The state Supreme Court ruled in favor of the Valley Forge Casino.

The casino is the first in the state of Pennsylvania to be granted the Category 3 license by the Pennsylvania Gaming Control Board. This type of license means the casino is intended to support the existing resort property, limits the number of table games and slots available, and has requirements for access to the gaming floor.  A Category 3 license also requires that anyone who wishes to gamble in the casino must either spend at least $10 elsewhere in the resort each visit or purchase a membership.  The $10 minimum was eliminated on October 27, 2017 with passage of new legislation. The casino currently is at the maximum number of slot machines, 600, and table games, 50, that is allowed at resort casinos. The casino has the option to add 15 tables for monthly poker or blackjack tournaments.

The casino was built for $130 million over the exhibition floor of the Valley Forge Convention Center. The convention center was built by J. Leon Altemose in 1985.

In 2018, Boyd Gaming purchased the property for $281 million.

On March 11, 2019, Valley Forge Casino Resort began offering sports betting at a sportsbook called the FanDuel Sportsbook at Valley Forge Casino Resort with a two-day soft opening. An official opening for the sportsbook occurred on March 13, 2019, with former Philadelphia Eagles tight end Brent Celek in attendance to place the first bet. The FanDuel online sportsbook launched on July 29, 2019.

In 2020, the Radisson Valley Forge Hotel was converted to the Valley Tower wing of the resort.

Overview
Valley Forge Casino Resort consists of 850 slot machines and 50 table games including Blackjack, Super 4 Blackjack, Craps, MiniBaccarat, Roulette, Spanish 21, Pai Gow, Pai Gow Poker, Three-Card Poker, Ulimate Texas Hold 'Em, and other assorted high limit table games. The casino is also home to the FanDuel Sportsbook at Valley Forge Casino Resort, a sportsbook offering sports betting.

The Valley Forge Casino Resort has two hotel towers: the Casino Tower (formerly the Scanticon Valley Forge Hotel) and the stardust tower  (formerly the Valley Tower) (formerly the Radisson Valley Forge Hotel, originally the Sheraton Valley Forge Hotel), together offering 486 hotel rooms and suites. The complex also includes a spa, fitness center, and two stores (Valley Shop and Valley Style). The parking lot can accommodate 3,000 vehicles and has free valet parking every day.

The casino's rewards club program, Valley Club Rewards, has two levels, Valley Player and Valley Elite.

Dining
Revolution Chophouse
Valley Tavern
Asianoodle
Italian Market
Copper Whisk
Dunkin' Donuts

Nightlife
The Vault
Revolution Chophouse
Center Bar
Valley Tavern
Valley Beach Pool Side Club (open seasonally)

See also
List of casinos in Pennsylvania 
List of casinos in the United States 
List of casino hotels

References

External links

Casinos in Pennsylvania
Casinos completed in 2012
Boyd Gaming
Hotels in Pennsylvania
Casino hotels